The Satellite Award for Best Actress in a Motion Picture is one of the annual awards given by the International Press Academy. The category has gone through several changes since its inception.
 From 1996 to 2010, two categories based on genre were presented, Best Actress – Motion Picture Drama and Best Actress – Motion Picture Comedy or Musical
 In 2011, the IPA pared down its Satellite nominations in the motion picture categories from 22 to 19 classifications; the change reflects the merger of drama and comedy under a general Best Picture heading, including the Best Actor/Actress headings and the Supporting headings.
 In 2016 and 2017, two winners were announced within the Best Actor category, one for the performance by an actor in a major studio film and other for a performance in an independent film.
Since 2018, the two categories based on genre are presented again replacing the Best Actor in a Motion Picture category for the Best Actor – Motion Picture Drama and Best Actor – Motion Picture Comedy or Musical categories previously presented.

Winners and nominees

Best Actress – Motion Picture Drama (1996–2010, 2018–present)

Best Actress – Motion Picture Musical or Comedy (1996–2010, 2018–present)

Best Actress – Motion Picture (2011–2017)

Multiple winners
2 awards
 Meryl Streep
 Sally Hawkins
 Frances McDormand
 Cate Blanchett
 Hilary Swank

Multiple nominees

10 nominations
 Meryl Streep

8 nominations
 Nicole Kidman

6 nominations
 Cate Blanchett
 Judi Dench
 Julianne Moore

5 nominations
 Annette Bening
 Kate Winslet

4 nominations
 Jessica Chastain
 Glenn Close
 Viola Davis
 Laura Linney
 Helen Mirren
 Charlize Theron
 Sigourney Weaver
 Reese Witherspoon
 Renée Zellweger

3 nominations
 Amy Adams
 Joan Allen
 Sandra Bullock
 Toni Collette
 Olivia Colman
 Marion Cotillard
 Penélope Cruz
 Sally Hawkins
 Keira Knightley
 Frances McDormand
 Carey Mulligan
 Natalie Portman
 Margot Robbie
 Julia Roberts
 Tilda Swinton
 Emily Watson
 Michelle Williams

2 nominations
 Brenda Blethyn
 Emily Blunt
 Helena Bonham Carter
 Julie Christie
 Jennifer Connelly
 Lady Gaga
 Maggie Gyllenhaal
 Anne Hathaway
 Katherine Heigl
 Angelina Jolie
 Catherine Keener
 Lisa Kudrow
 Diane Lane
 Jennifer Lawrence
 Gwyneth Paltrow
 Rosamund Pike
 Saoirse Ronan
 Kristin Scott Thomas
 Emma Stone
 Emma Thompson
 Naomi Watts
 Robin Wright 
 Constance Wu

See also
 Academy Award for Best Actress
 Golden Globe Award for Best Actress – Motion Picture Musical or Comedy
 Golden Globe Award for Best Actress – Motion Picture Drama
 Critics' Choice Movie Award for Best Actress

References

External links
 Official website

Actress Motion Picture Drama
Film awards for lead actress